Central Stadium, was a multi-purpose stadium in Tbilisi, Georgia.  Its official name between 1937 and 1953 was the Beria Dinamo Stadium which it was named in honor of Lavrentiy Beria. It was the home ground of the FC Dinamo Tbilisi until the current Boris Paichadze Stadium opened in 1976.  The stadium held 35,000 spectators.

References

External links
 Stadium information

Athletics (track and field) venues in the Soviet Union
Defunct football venues in Georgia (country)
Football venues in Tbilisi
Football venues in the Soviet Union
Multi-purpose stadiums in Georgia (country)